The DPR Korea Women's Premier League (Chosŏn'gŭl: 조선민주주의인민공화국 녀자 1부류축구련맹전; Hanja:  朝鮮民主主義人民共和國 女子 一部流蹴球聯盟戰) is the top flight of women's association football in North Korea. The competition is run by the DPR Korea Football Association.

History
The first North Korean women's championship was contested in the 2001–02 season.

Champions
The list of champions and runners-up:

Most successful clubs

References

External links 
 DPR Korea Football

 
North Korea
Football competitions in North Korea
Women
2004 establishments in North Korea
Sports leagues established in 2001